The MIT150 is a list published by the Boston Globe, in honor of the 150th anniversary of the Massachusetts Institute of Technology (MIT) in 2011, listing 150 of the most significant innovators, inventions or ideas from MIT, its alumni, faculty, and related people and organizations in the 150 year history of the institute.

The top 30 innovators and inventions on the list are:

 Tim Berners-Lee, inventor of the World Wide Web
 Eric Lander, team leader for sequencing one-third of the Human Genome
 William Shockley, inventor of the solid-state transistor
 Ray Tomlinson, inventor of the "@" symbol use in email addresses
 Phillip A. Sharp, founder of Biogen Idec
 Ken Olsen and Harlan Anderson, founders of Digital Equipment Corp.
 Helen Greiner and Colin Angle, founders of iRobot Corp.
 Ellen Swallow Richards, nutrition expert, and the first woman admitted to MIT
 Amar Bose, founder of Bose Corporation
 Ivan Getting, founder of Aerospace Corp., co-inventor of GPS
 Salvador Luria, father of modern biology
 Joseph Jacobson, co-founder of E Ink
 Dan Bricklin, Bob Frankston, inventors of VisiCalc
 Brewster Kahle, founder of the Internet Archive
 Daniel Lewin, F. Thomson Leighton, co-founders of Akamai
 Vannevar Bush, science advisor to President Franklin D. Roosevelt, founder of Raytheon, father of the National Science Foundation
 Pietro Belluschi, dean of the MIT School of Architecture and Planning
 Ron Rivest, Adi Shamir, Leonard Adleman, inventors of RSA cryptography
 Charles Draper, inventor of the first inertial guidance system
 Herbert Kalmus, Daniel Comstock, cofounders of Technicolor
 John Dorrance, inventor of Campbell Soup
 David Baltimore, Nobel laureate
 Robert Weinberg, cofounder of the Whitehead Institute
 William Thompson Sedgwick, founder of the Harvard School of Public Health
 Alfred P. Sloan, CEO of General Motors
 William Hewlett, cofounder of Hewlett Packard
 Marc Raibert, founder of Boston Dynamics and creator of BigDog
 Hugh Herr, founder of iWalk and head of the Biomechatronics research group at the MIT Media Lab
 Hoyt C. Hottel, oil industry pioneer
 Robert Swanson, cofounder of Genentech

See also

 List of awards for contributions to culture
 Massachusetts Institute of Technology

References

External links
 MIT150 special from the Boston Globe

Business and industry awards
Science and technology awards
Academic awards
Awards established in 2011
Invention awards
Massachusetts_Institute_of_Technology